Sheep Mountain may refer to:

In the United States 

(The Geographic Names Information System (GNIS) lists at least 160 mountains with Sheep Mountain as its full or partial name)

Sheep Mountain (Alaska), in the Talkeetna Mountains
Sheep Mountain (Arizona) is the tallest peak in the Gila Mountains, Yuma County, Arizona
Sheep Mountain (Colorado), summit in Rabbit Ears Range
Sheep Mountain (San Miguel and Dolores Counties, Colorado), in the San Juan Mountains
Sheep Mountain (Idaho)
Sheep Mountain (Carbon County, Montana) in Carbon County, Montana
Sheep Mountain (Carter County, Montana) in Carter County, Montana
Sheep Mountain (Flathead County, Montana) in the Lewis Range, Glacier National Park, Montana
Sheep Mountain (Jefferson County, Montana) in Jefferson County, Montana
Sheep Mountain (Judith Basin County, Montana) in Judith Basin County, Montana
Sheep Mountain (Lake County, Montana) in Lake County, Montana
Sheep Mountain (Madison County, Montana) in the Gallatin Range, Montana
Sheep Mountain (Meagher County, Montana) in Meagher County, Montana
 Sheep Mountain in Mineral County, Montana
Sheep Mountain (Missoula County, Montana) in Missoula County, Montana
Sheep Mountain (Park County, Montana)  in the Absaroka Range, Montana
Sheep Mountain (Nye County, Nevada)
Sheep Mountain (Snohomish County, Washington)
Sheep Mountain (Teton County, Wyoming) in the Gros Ventre Range, Wyoming

In Canada 
 Sheep Mountain (Yukon), in Kluane National Park